Temporalities or temporal goods are the secular properties and possessions of the church. The term is most often used to describe those properties (a Stift in German or sticht in Dutch) that were used to support a bishop or other religious person or establishment. Its opposite are spiritualities.

History
In the Middle Ages, the temporalities were usually those lands that were held by a bishop and used to support him. After the Investiture Crisis was resolved, the temporalities of a diocese were usually granted to the bishop by the secular ruler after the bishop was consecrated.

If a bishop within the Holy Roman Empire had gained secular overlordship to his temporalities imperially recognised as an imperial state, then the temporalities were usually called a Hochstift, or an Erzstift (for an archbishop). Sometimes, this granting of the temporalities could take some time. Other times, a bishop-elect gained his temporalities even before or without his papal confirmation by an imperial act called "liege indult" (Lehnsindult). The temporalities were often confiscated by secular rulers to punish bishops.

See also

 Post-medieval parish temporalities in England

References

Catholic Church and finance
Catholic canon law of property